John Bahen (4 October 1943 – 2 May 2017) was an Australian rules footballer for the Fitzroy Football Club in the Victorian Football League (VFL).

Football

Fitzroy (VFL)
He played 67 senior games for Fitzroy between 1962 and 1967.

On 6 July 1963, playing in the centre, he was a member of the young and inexperienced Fitzroy team that comprehensively and unexpectedly defeated Geelong, 9.13 (67) to 3.13 (31) in the 1963 Miracle Match.

Port Melbourne (VFA)
He played 13 senior matched for Port Melbourne over two seasons (1968-1969).

After football
In retirement he went on to own a number of city hotels including The Greyhound Hotel, The Imperial and The Station Hotel NM.

Death
Bahen died on 2 May 2017, aged 73.

See also
 1963 Miracle Match

Notes

References

External links
 
 
 John Bahen, at The VFA Project.

1943 births
2017 deaths
Fitzroy Football Club players
Port Melbourne Football Club players
Australian rules footballers from Victoria (Australia)